Miloslav Blažek (22 June 1922 in Přívoz – 19 February 1985 in Ostrava) was a Czechoslovak ice hockey player who competed in the 1952 Winter Olympics.

References

External links

1922 births
1985 deaths
Olympic ice hockey players of Czechoslovakia
Ice hockey players at the 1952 Winter Olympics
Sportspeople from Ostrava
HC Vítkovice players
Czech ice hockey forwards
Czechoslovak ice hockey forwards